Haji Sayed Hussain Hazara (born Quetta, British India; 15 February 1917, 9 August 2002 – Quetta, Pakistan) was a Pakistani politician. He belonged to the Hazara people. He was member of Majlis al Shura of Pakistan in Zia-ul-Haq's era. His son Sayed Nasir Ali Shah is Ex-Member of National Assembly from NA-259. He was a Pakistani Senator in period of 1973 till 1975 and from 1975 till 1977.He was member of National Awami Party (Wali). He was the president of Balochistan Shia Conference.His two books which were published before his death are Mashal e Hidayath ( Lantern of Guidance) and Bey-Pardagi and Bey-Hayayi Door E Hazir mai.

See also 
 List of Hazara people
 List of people from Quetta
 Sayed Nasir Ali Shah

References

 http://awaztoday.com/singleprofile/346/Syed-Nasir-Ali-Shah.aspx
 http://senate.gov.pk/senate/manage/uploads/file/test/73-75.pdf
 http://senate.gov.pk/senate/manage/uploads/file/test/75-77.pdf

External links
Swaz today profile of  

Pakistani people of Hazara descent
Members of the Senate of Pakistan
Politicians from Quetta
2002 deaths
1917 births